The Javelin Wichawk is a sporting biplane designed in the United States in the early 1970s and marketed in plan form for amateur construction.

Design and development
The Wichawk is a conventional design with staggered single-bay wings of equal span braced with N-struts and having fixed, tailwheel undercarriage. The pilot and a single passenger sit in side-by-side configuration in an open cockpit, but the plans make allowances for the aircraft to be built in two- or three-seat tandem configuration instead. The fuselage and empennage are of welded steel tube construction, with the wings built with wooden spars and aluminium alloy ribs, all covered in doped aircraft fabric.

Operational history
Some 250 sets of plans had been sold by 1987, with 14 aircraft known to be flying by then.

In January 2014 nine examples were registered in the United States with the Federal Aviation Administration, but a total of 18 had been registered at one time.

Specifications

References

External links
Photo of a Javelin Wichawk
Popular Mechanics Article from 1974

Wichawk
1970s United States sport aircraft
Homebuilt aircraft
Biplanes
Single-engined tractor aircraft
Aircraft first flown in 1971